Klyuchi is a rural locality (a khutor) in Kumylzhenskoye Rural Settlement, Kumylzhensky District, Volgograd Oblast, Russia. The population was 22 as of 2010.

Geography 
Klyuchi is located in forest steppe, on Khopyorsko-Buzulukskaya Plain, 6 km south of Kumylzhenskaya (the district's administrative centre) by road. Kumylzhenskaya is the nearest rural locality.

References 

Rural localities in Kumylzhensky District